Hodgesiella rhodorrhisella is a moth in the family Cosmopterigidae. It is found on the Canary Islands.

The wingspan is 10.6–11 mm. The forewings are brownish grey and the hindwings are dark grey, but yellowish grey at the base.

The larvae feed on Convolvulus floridus. They mine the leaves of their host plant. The mine mostly starts at the leaf tip or near the midrib and has the form of a full depth blotch. Most frass is deposited in the first part of the mine. The larvae are pale yellow with a brown head capsule. Full-grown larvae are red and 6-6.5 mm long.

References

Moths described in 1970
Cosmopteriginae